George McGrory Taggart (born 26 February 1937) was a Scottish footballer who played for Kilmarnock, St Johnstone, Berwick Rangers and Dumbarton.

References

1937 births
Scottish footballers
Dumbarton F.C. players
Berwick Rangers F.C. players
Kilmarnock F.C. players
Scottish Football League players
Living people
St Johnstone F.C. players
Association football wing halves